Paul Kirk (born 13 May 1953) is a Northern Irish retired football player and manager.

Biography
Paul Kirk played football during his career for Ballymena United, Glentoran, Crusaders, and Linfield, winning the league title with 3 of the four clubs. He also had a spell with Aston Villa in the 70s but was most notable in his managerial career for managing Lisburn Distillery for 13 years. As one of the longest serving managers in the Irish League, he was surprisingly sacked at the beginning of the 2009/10 season after taking the club into Europe for the fourth time in six years. Paul also won the Ulster cup and two league winning promotions and was manager of the year on two occasions. A UEFA Pro licence coach, Paul is the current manager of Amateur League side Lisburn Rangers F.C.

Kirk played for the Glens in the 1970–71 European Cup against Waterford United and Frankfurt Eintrach. Eight years later he joined Waterford utd where he won the FAI Cup and league cup in 1980 . As manager of the Northern Ireland amateur league representative team Paul won 3 consecutive Briton Rose bowls against Scotland

Kirk scored twice against Hibernians F.C. in the 1980-81 European Cup Winners' Cup.

His son Andy Kirk is a retired footballer and former Northern Ireland international.

Honours
Irish League : 3
 Glentoran 1969/70
 Crusaders 1975/76
 Linfield F.C. 1979/79
FAI Cup
 Waterford United 1980

References

1953 births
Living people
Association footballers from Northern Ireland
Lisburn Distillery F.C. managers
Glentoran F.C. players
Crusaders F.C. players
Bangor F.C. players
Linfield F.C. players
Ards F.C. players
Association footballers from Belfast
NIFL Premiership players
Waterford F.C. players
League of Ireland players
Association footballers not categorized by position
Football managers from Northern Ireland